The Sanremo Music Festival 1961 was the eleventh annual Sanremo Music Festival, held at the Sanremo Casino in Sanremo, province of Imperia between 26 January and 6 February 1961.

The show was presented by Lilli Lembo and Giuliana Calandra for the first three nights, while Alberto Lionello replaced Calandra in the final night. Ezio Radaelli served as artistic director.
  
According to the rules of this edition every song was performed in a double performance by a couple of singers or groups. The winners of the Festival were Luciano Tajoli and Betty Curtis with the song "Al di là".

Participants and results

References 

Sanremo Music Festival by year
1961 in Italian music
1961 in music
1961 music festivals